Opi is a community in Enugu State of southeastern Nigeria. It is populated by the Igbo people and located in Nsukka region. It is the location of a prehistoric archaeological site which contains iron smelting furnaces and slag dated to 750 BC. Iron ore was smelted in natural draft furnaces and molten slag was drained through shallow conduits to collecting pits forming huge slag blocks weighing up to 47 kg. The operating temperatures are estimated to have varied between 1,155 and 1,450 °C.

See also 

Archaeology of Igbo-Ukwu
Lejja

Further reading 
IRON TECHNOLOGY AND POLITICAL POWER: EXAMPLES FROM THE IRON SMELTING BELT OF NSUKKA AREA, ENUGU STATE, SOUTH-EASTERN NIGERIA by CHIDOZIE S. AGU and CHUKWUMA, C. OPATA, UNIVERSITY OF NIGERIA, NSUKKA
The Archaeology of Africa: Food, Metals and Towns

References

Archaeological sites in Nigeria
Archaeological sites of Western Africa